Tavua may refer to:
 Tavua, Fiji, a town in Ba Province on the largest island of Fiji
 Tavua Island
 Tavua F.C. (for Football Club) 
 Tavua District, Fiji
 Tavua (Open Constituency, Fiji)
 Tavua (Indian Communal Constituency, Fiji)
 Tavua (crater), on Mars